Tamás Germán (born 26 March 1987) is a Hungarian professional footballer who plays as a striker for Szeged-Csanád.

External links
Profile at HLSZ 

Player profile 

1987 births
People from Gyula
Living people
Hungarian footballers
Association football forwards
Békéscsaba 1912 Előre footballers
Gyulai Termál FC players
Lombard-Pápa TFC footballers
Szolnoki MÁV FC footballers
FC Emmen players
Nyíregyháza Spartacus FC players
Szeged-Csanád Grosics Akadémia footballers
Nemzeti Bajnokság II players
Eerste Divisie players
Nemzeti Bajnokság I players
Nemzeti Bajnokság III players
Hungarian expatriate footballers
Expatriate footballers in the Netherlands
Hungarian expatriate sportspeople in the Netherlands
Sportspeople from Békés County